The men's moguls competition of the FIS Freestyle Ski and Snowboarding World Championships 2015 was held at Kreischberg, Austria on January 18 (qualifying and finals).
45 athletes from 19 countries competed.

Qualification
The following are the results of the qualification.

Final
The following are the results of the finals.

References

Moguls, men's